Edward Woodruff may refer to:
 Edward Nelson Woodruff, mayor of Peoria, Illinois
 Edward L. Woodruff, American architect